Sydir Holubovych (1873–1938) was a Ukrainian politician.

Born in Tovstenke (near Husiatyn, Galicia, Austria-Hungary, now Chortkiv Raion, Ternopil Oblast), he studied law at Lviv University. He became a member of Austrian parliament from 1911 to 1918, and the Diet of Galicia in 1913. After World War I, he was the second, after Kost Levitsky, Prime Minister of the West Ukrainian National Republic, from January 4 to June 9, 1919.
Holubovych was one of the founders of the Ukrainian National Democratic Alliance (UNDO) in 1925. He died in Lviv on January 12, 1938.

References

External links

1873 births
1938 deaths
Burials at Lychakiv Cemetery
People from Husiatyn
People from the Kingdom of Galicia and Lodomeria
Ukrainian Austro-Hungarians
Ukrainian National Democratic Alliance politicians
Members of the Austrian House of Deputies (1911–1918)
Members of the Diet of Galicia and Lodomeria
West Ukrainian People's Republic people
University of Lviv alumni